The Denial is a 1925 American silent drama film directed by Hobart Henley. The film stars Claire Windsor, Bert Roach, William Haines, Lucille Ricksen, and Robert Agnew. The film was written by Agnes Christine Johnston based on the play The Square Peg by Lewis Beach.

Lucille Ricksen died of tuberculosis the same month this film was released.

Plot
As described in a film magazine review, a Mother tries to direct the affections of her daughter as she sees fit. When her daughter rebels, she realizes how such domination spoiled her own life and she allows her daughter to marry the man of her choice, a young officer. The Mother's similar history from years past is presented in flashbacks.

Cast

Preservation
A partial print of The Denial is in the collection of George Eastman House.

References

External links

Stills, lobby cards, and advertisements from The Denial at the Claire Windsor website

1925 films
1925 drama films
Silent American drama films
American silent feature films
American black-and-white films
Films directed by Hobart Henley
Lost American films
Metro-Goldwyn-Mayer films
1925 lost films
Lost drama films
1920s American films